Soze is a small village on a hill above Lake Mola southwest of  Ilirska Bistrica in the Inner Carniola region of Slovenia.

The local church in the settlement is dedicated to Mary Help of Christians and belongs to the Parish of Harije.

References

External links
Soze on Geopedia

Populated places in the Municipality of Ilirska Bistrica